Patrick Windhorst is an American politician from Illinois.
Windhorst is a Republican member of the Illinois House of Representatives for the 118th district. The 118th district, located in Southern Illinois, includes all or parts of Anna, Belknap, Belle Prairie City, Brookport, Broughton, Buncombe, Burnside, Cairo, Carbondale, Carrier Mills, Cave-In-Rock, Cypress, Dahlgren, Dongola, East Cape Girardeau, Eddyville, Eldorado, Elizabethtown, Equality, Galatia, Golconda, Goreville, Harrisburg, Joppa, Junction, Karnak, Makanda, Marion, McClure, McLeansboro, Metropolis, Mound City, Mounds, New Grand Chain, New Haven, Old Shawneetown, Olive Branch, Olmsted, Omaha, Pulaski, Raleigh, Ridgway, Rosiclare, Shawneetown, Simpson, Stonefort, Tamms, Thebes, Ullin, and Vienna. Windhorst lives in Metropolis, Illinois.

Education 
Upon graduation from Massac County high school in Metropolis, Windhorst earned an Associates degree from Shawnee Community College. In 1997, Windhorst earned a Bachelor of Science degree in Journalism from University of Illinois at Urbana–Champaign. In 2000, Windhorst earned a JD degree from Southern Illinois University School of Law.

Career 
In 2000, Windhorst started his career as an attorney at Denton & Keuler, until 2004.
Windhorst was an elected State's Attorney for Massac County.
In the 2018 general election, Windhorst won the election and became a member of Illinois House of Representatives. Windhorst defeated appointed Democratic incumbent Natalie Phelps Finnie by a margin of 15.2 percentage points.

As of July 3, 2022, Representative Windhorst is a member of the following Illinois House committees:

 Appropriations - Human Services Committee (HAPH)
 Ethics & Elections Committee (SHEE)
 Family Law & Probate Subcommittee (HJUA-FLAW)
 Firearms and Firearm Safety Subcommittee (HJUC-FIRE)
 Judiciary - Civil Committee (HJUA)
 Judiciary - Criminal Committee (HJUC)
 Restorative Justice Committee (SHRJ)
 Sentencing, Penalties and Criminal Procedure Committee (HJUC-SPCP)

Electoral history

Personal life 
Windhorst's wife is Holly Windhorst. They have two children.

References

External links
 Profile at the Illinois General Assembly
 Campaign website

Year of birth missing (living people)
21st-century American politicians
Republican Party members of the Illinois House of Representatives
People from Metropolis, Illinois
Southern Illinois University School of Law alumni
University of Illinois Urbana-Champaign College of Media alumni
Living people